Queens University in short QU is a private university in Bangladesh. It was established in 1996 under the Private University Act 1992. Hamida Banu Shova is the founder and chairperson of this university. It's campuses are located in Banani and Uttara of the capital. It offers undergraduate and graduate education in several subjects.

List of vice-chancellors 

 Prof. Dr. Abdul Khalek (present)

Faculty
QU will organize its academic programs into different faculties. Each faculty consists of several disciplines which are basically interdisciplinary in character.

Undergraduate courses
 B.Sc. in Computer Science & Engineering (CSE)
 B.Sc. in Textile Engineering (Proposed)
 B.Sc. in Environmental Science and Management (Proposed)
 Bachelor of Business Administration (BBA)
 Bachelor of Laws: LL.B (Hons)
 BA (Hons) in International Relations and Development
 BA (Hons) in English
 BA (Hons) in Bengali (Proposed)
 BA (Hons) in Political Science (Proposed)
 BA (Hons) in Folklore (Proposed)
 BA (Hons) in Sociology (Proposed)

Post-graduate courses
 Master of English (Preliminary and Final)
 Master of Business Administration (MBA-Regular)
 Master of Business Administration (MBA-Executive)
 Master of Laws: LL.M
 Master of Political Science (Proposed)

Library
The QU library has a good collection of resources in Business, Management, Computer Science, Engineering, Information Technology, Economics, Law, Environmental Studies, English Language and Literature, History, Culture, Psychology, Religion, Sociology, Mathematics, Statistics, Architecture, etc.

Extracurricular activities
The university has an arrangement of extra curricular activities for its students. Such as sports and games, software fair, seminars and cultural activities.

Accreditation
The academic programs of the university are recognized by many national and international educational institutions and professional bodies such as BCS (Bangladesh Computer Society) and Bangladesh Bar Council.

Footnotes

External links
 Official Queens University Web Site
 UGC: List of Universities
 UNESCO: List of Bangladesh universities

Educational institutions established in 1996
Private universities in Bangladesh
Universities and colleges in Dhaka
1996 establishments in Bangladesh